Ahmed Adel Abdel Moneam (born 10 April 1987) is an Egyptian professional footballer who plays as a goalkeeper for Egyptian League club Misr Lel-Makkasa.

Ahmed made his competitive debut for Al Ahly against Ismaily in season 2007–08 and it was 1-1 draw after Essam El-Hadary departure to FC Sion and Amir Abdelhamid's  injury.

Ahmed Adel was selected to play for Egypt at the 2005 FIFA World Youth Championship in the Netherlands.

2009–10 Season
In the 2009–10 season, under new coach Hossam El Badry, Ahmed Adel was chosen as the regular keeper for the team. Ahmed Adel made great performances and managed to keep many clean sheets. Prior to that Ahmed Adel was chosen for the preliminary 2010 Africa Cup of Nations squad for Egypt but was left out of the final 23-man squad. When Al Ahly signed Sherif Ekramy halfway through the 2009–10 season, and he no longer became part of the starting eleven.

2011–12 Season

He made some appearances due to Sherif Ekramy's injury - but is no longer a regular starter.

References

External links

 
Ahmed Adel Abd El-Moneam

1987 births
Living people
Egyptian footballers
Egyptian Premier League players
Association football goalkeepers
Al Ahly SC players
Misr Lel Makkasa SC players
Sportspeople from Port Said